Hypertension (HTN or HT), also known as high blood pressure (HBP), is a long-term medical condition in which the blood pressure in the arteries is persistently elevated. High blood pressure usually does not cause symptoms. Long-term high blood pressure, however, is a major risk factor for stroke, coronary artery disease, heart failure, atrial fibrillation, peripheral arterial disease, vision loss, chronic kidney disease, and dementia. Hypertension is a major cause of premature death worldwide.

High blood pressure is classified as primary (essential) hypertension or secondary hypertension. About 90–95% of cases are primary, defined as high blood pressure due to nonspecific lifestyle and genetic factors. Lifestyle factors that increase the risk include excess salt in the diet, excess body weight, smoking, and alcohol use. The remaining 5–10% of cases are categorized as secondary high blood pressure, defined as high blood pressure due to an identifiable cause, such as chronic kidney disease, narrowing of the kidney arteries, an endocrine disorder, or the use of birth control pills.

Blood pressure is classified by two measurements, the systolic and diastolic pressures, which are the maximum and minimum pressures, respectively. For most adults, normal blood pressure at rest is within the range of 100–130 millimeters mercury (mmHg) systolic and 60–80 mmHg diastolic. For most adults, high blood pressure is present if the resting blood pressure is persistently at or above 130/80 or 140/90 mmHg. Different numbers apply to children. Ambulatory blood pressure monitoring over a 24-hour period appears more accurate than office-based blood pressure measurement.

Lifestyle changes and medications can lower blood pressure and decrease the risk of health complications. Lifestyle changes include weight loss, physical exercise, decreased salt intake, reducing alcohol intake, and a healthy diet. If lifestyle changes are not sufficient, then blood pressure medications are used. Up to three medications taken concurrently can control blood pressure in 90% of people. The treatment of moderately high arterial blood pressure (defined as >160/100 mmHg) with medications is associated with an improved life expectancy. The effect of treatment of blood pressure between 130/80 mmHg and 160/100 mmHg is less clear, with some reviews finding benefit and others finding unclear benefit. High blood pressure affects between 16 and 37% of the population globally. In 2010 hypertension was believed to have been a factor in 18% of all deaths (9.4 million globally).

Signs and symptoms
Hypertension is rarely accompanied by symptoms, and its identification is usually through screening, or when seeking healthcare for an unrelated problem. Some people with high blood pressure report headaches (particularly at the back of the head and in the morning), as well as lightheadedness, vertigo, tinnitus (buzzing or hissing in the ears), altered vision or fainting episodes. These symptoms, however, might be related to associated anxiety rather than the high blood pressure itself.

On physical examination, hypertension may be associated with the presence of changes in the optic fundus seen by ophthalmoscopy. The severity of the changes typical of hypertensive retinopathy is graded from I to IV; grades I and II may be difficult to differentiate. The severity of the retinopathy correlates roughly with the duration or the severity of the hypertension.

Secondary hypertension

Secondary hypertension is hypertension due to an identifiable cause, and may result in certain specific additional signs and symptoms. For example, as well as causing high blood pressure, Cushing's syndrome frequently causes truncal obesity, glucose intolerance, moon face, a hump of fat behind the neck and shoulders (referred to as a buffalo hump), and purple abdominal stretch marks. Hyperthyroidism frequently causes weight loss with increased appetite, fast heart rate, bulging eyes, and tremor. Renal artery stenosis (RAS) may be associated with a localized abdominal bruit to the left or right of the midline (unilateral RAS), or in both locations (bilateral RAS). Coarctation of the aorta frequently causes a decreased blood pressure in the lower extremities relative to the arms, or delayed or absent femoral arterial pulses. Pheochromocytoma may cause abrupt episodes of hypertension accompanied by headache, palpitations, pale appearance, and excessive sweating.

Hypertensive crisis

Severely elevated blood pressure (equal to or greater than a systolic 180 or diastolic of 110) is referred to as a hypertensive crisis. Hypertensive crisis is categorized as either hypertensive urgency or hypertensive emergency, according to the absence or presence of end organ damage, respectively.

In hypertensive urgency, there is no evidence of end organ damage resulting from the elevated blood pressure. In these cases, oral medications are used to lower the BP gradually over 24 to 48 hours.

In hypertensive emergency, there is evidence of direct damage to one or more organs. The most affected organs include the brain, kidney, heart and lungs, producing symptoms which may include confusion, drowsiness, chest pain and breathlessness. In hypertensive emergency, the blood pressure must be reduced more rapidly to stop ongoing organ damage, however, there is a lack of randomized controlled trial evidence for this approach.

Pregnancy

Hypertension occurs in approximately 8–10% of pregnancies. Two blood pressure measurements six hours apart of greater than 140/90 mm Hg are diagnostic of hypertension in pregnancy. High blood pressure in pregnancy can be classified as pre-existing hypertension, gestational hypertension, or pre-eclampsia.

Pre-eclampsia is a serious condition of the second half of pregnancy and following delivery characterised by increased blood pressure and the presence of protein in the urine. It occurs in about 5% of pregnancies and is responsible for approximately 16% of all maternal deaths globally. Pre-eclampsia also doubles the risk of death of the baby around the time of birth. Usually there are no symptoms in pre-eclampsia and it is detected by routine screening. When symptoms of pre-eclampsia occur the most common are headache, visual disturbance (often "flashing lights"), vomiting, pain over the stomach, and swelling. Pre-eclampsia can occasionally progress to a life-threatening condition called eclampsia, which is a hypertensive emergency and has several serious complications including vision loss, brain swelling, seizures, kidney failure, pulmonary edema, and disseminated intravascular coagulation (a blood clotting disorder).

In contrast, gestational hypertension is defined as new-onset hypertension during pregnancy without protein in the urine.

Children
Failure to thrive, seizures, irritability, lack of energy, and difficulty in breathing can be associated with hypertension in newborns and young infants. In older infants and children, hypertension can cause headache, unexplained irritability, fatigue, failure to thrive, blurred vision, nosebleeds, and facial paralysis.

Causes

Primary hypertension

Hypertension results from a complex interaction of genes and environmental factors. Numerous common genetic variants with small effects on blood pressure have been identified as well as some rare genetic variants with large effects on blood pressure. Also, genome-wide association studies (GWAS) have identified 35 genetic loci related to blood pressure; 12 of these genetic loci influencing blood pressure were newly found. Sentinel SNP for each new genetic locus identified has shown an association with DNA methylation at multiple nearby CpG sites. These sentinel SNP are located within genes related to vascular smooth muscle and renal function. DNA methylation might affect in some way linking common genetic variation to multiple phenotypes even though mechanisms underlying these associations are not understood. Single variant test performed in this study for the 35 sentinel SNP (known and new) showed that genetic variants singly or in aggregate contribute to risk of clinical phenotypes related to high blood pressure.

Blood pressure rises with aging when associated with a western diet and lifestyle and the risk of becoming hypertensive in later life is significant. Several environmental factors influence blood pressure. High salt intake raises the blood pressure in salt sensitive individuals; lack of exercise and central obesity can play a role in individual cases. The possible roles of other factors such as caffeine consumption, and vitamin D deficiency are less clear. Insulin resistance, which is common in obesity and is a component of syndrome X (or the metabolic syndrome), also contributes to hypertension.

Events in early life, such as low birth weight, maternal smoking, and lack of breastfeeding may be risk factors for adult essential hypertension, although the mechanisms linking these exposures to adult hypertension remain unclear. An increased rate of high blood uric acid has been found in untreated people with hypertension in comparison with people with normal blood pressure, although it is uncertain whether the former plays a causal role or is subsidiary to poor kidney function. Average blood pressure may be higher in the winter than in the summer. Periodontal disease is also associated with high blood pressure.

Secondary hypertension

Secondary hypertension results from an identifiable cause. Kidney disease is the most common secondary cause of hypertension. Hypertension can also be caused by endocrine conditions, such as Cushing's syndrome, hyperthyroidism, hypothyroidism, acromegaly, Conn's syndrome or hyperaldosteronism, renal artery stenosis (from atherosclerosis or fibromuscular dysplasia), hyperparathyroidism, and pheochromocytoma. Other causes of secondary hypertension include obesity, sleep apnea, pregnancy, coarctation of the aorta, excessive eating of liquorice, excessive drinking of alcohol, certain prescription medicines, herbal remedies, and stimulants such as coffee, cocaine and methamphetamine. Arsenic exposure through drinking water has been shown to correlate with elevated blood pressure. Depression was also linked to hypertension. Loneliness is also a risk factor.

A 2018 review found that any alcohol increased blood pressure in males while over one or two drinks increased the risk in females.

Pathophysiology

In most people with established essential hypertension, increased resistance to blood flow (total peripheral resistance) accounts for the high pressure while cardiac output remains normal. There is evidence that some younger people with prehypertension or 'borderline hypertension' have high cardiac output, an elevated heart rate and normal peripheral resistance, termed hyperkinetic borderline hypertension. These individuals develop the typical features of established essential hypertension in later life as their cardiac output falls and peripheral resistance rises with age. Whether this pattern is typical of all people who ultimately develop hypertension is disputed. The increased peripheral resistance in established hypertension is mainly attributable to structural narrowing of small arteries and arterioles, although a reduction in the number or density of capillaries may also contribute.

It is not clear whether or not vasoconstriction of arteriolar blood vessels plays a role in hypertension. Hypertension is also associated with decreased peripheral venous compliance which may increase venous return, increase cardiac preload and, ultimately, cause diastolic dysfunction.

Pulse pressure (the difference between systolic and diastolic blood pressure) is frequently increased in older people with hypertension. This can mean that systolic pressure is abnormally high, but diastolic pressure may be normal or low, a condition termed isolated systolic hypertension. The high pulse pressure in elderly people with hypertension or isolated systolic hypertension is explained by increased arterial stiffness, which typically accompanies aging and may be exacerbated by high blood pressure.

Many mechanisms have been proposed to account for the rise in peripheral resistance in hypertension. Most evidence implicates either disturbances in the kidneys' salt and water handling (particularly abnormalities in the intrarenal renin–angiotensin system) or abnormalities of the sympathetic nervous system. These mechanisms are not mutually exclusive and it is likely that both contribute to some extent in most cases of essential hypertension. It has also been suggested that endothelial dysfunction and vascular inflammation may also contribute to increased peripheral resistance and vascular damage in hypertension. Interleukin 17 has garnered interest for its role in increasing the production of several other immune system chemical signals thought to be involved in hypertension such as tumor necrosis factor alpha, interleukin 1, interleukin 6, and interleukin 8.

Excessive sodium or insufficient potassium in the diet leads to excessive intracellular sodium, which contracts vascular smooth muscle, restricting blood flow and so increases blood pressure.

Diagnosis
Hypertension is diagnosed on the basis of a persistently high resting blood pressure. The American Heart Association (AHA) recommends at least three resting measurements on at least two separate health care visits. The UK National Institute for Health and Care Excellence recommends ambulatory blood pressure monitoring to confirm the diagnosis of hypertension if a clinic blood pressure is 140/90 mmHg or higher.

Measurement technique 
For an accurate diagnosis of hypertension to be made, it is essential for proper blood pressure measurement technique to be used. Improper measurement of blood pressure is common and can change the blood pressure reading by up to 10 mmHg, which can lead to misdiagnosis and misclassification of hypertension. Correct blood pressure measurement technique involves several steps. Proper blood pressure measurement requires the person whose blood pressure is being measured to sit quietly for at least five minutes which is then followed by application of a properly fitted blood pressure cuff to a bare upper arm. The person should be seated with their back supported, feet flat on the floor, and with their legs uncrossed. The person whose blood pressure is being measured should avoid talking or moving during this process. The arm being measured should be supported on a flat surface at the level of the heart. Blood pressure measurement should be done in a quiet room so the medical professional checking the blood pressure can hear the Korotkoff sounds while listening to the brachial artery with a stethoscope for accurate blood pressure measurements. The blood pressure cuff should be deflated slowly (2–3 mmHg per second) while listening for the Korotkoff sounds. The bladder should be emptied before a person's blood pressure is measured since this can increase blood pressure by up to 15/10 mmHg. Multiple blood pressure readings (at least two) spaced 1–2 minutes apart should be obtained to ensure accuracy. Ambulatory blood pressure monitoring over 12 to 24 hours is the most accurate method to confirm the diagnosis. An exception to this is those with very high blood pressure readings especially when there is poor organ function.

With the availability of 24-hour ambulatory blood pressure monitors and home blood pressure machines, the importance of not wrongly diagnosing those who have white coat hypertension has led to a change in protocols. In the United Kingdom, current best practice is to follow up a single raised clinic reading with ambulatory measurement, or less ideally with home blood pressure monitoring over the course of 7 days. The United States Preventive Services Task Force also recommends getting measurements outside of the healthcare environment. Pseudohypertension in the elderly or noncompressibility artery syndrome may also require consideration. This condition is believed to be due to calcification of the arteries resulting in abnormally high blood pressure readings with a blood pressure cuff while intra arterial measurements of blood pressure are normal. Orthostatic hypertension is when blood pressure increases upon standing.

Other investigations 

Once the diagnosis of hypertension has been made, healthcare providers should attempt to identify the underlying cause based on risk factors and other symptoms, if present. Secondary hypertension is more common in preadolescent children, with most cases caused by kidney disease. Primary or essential hypertension is more common in adolescents and adults and has multiple risk factors, including obesity and a family history of hypertension. Laboratory tests can also be performed to identify possible causes of secondary hypertension, and to determine whether hypertension has caused damage to the heart, eyes, and kidneys. Additional tests for diabetes and high cholesterol levels are usually performed because these conditions are additional risk factors for the development of heart disease and may require treatment.

Initial assessment of the hypertensive people should include a complete history and physical examination. Serum creatinine is measured to assess for the presence of kidney disease, which can be either the cause or the result of hypertension. Serum creatinine alone may overestimate glomerular filtration rate and the 2003 JNC7 guidelines advocate the use of predictive equations such as the Modification of Diet in Renal Disease (MDRD) formula to estimate glomerular filtration rate (eGFR). eGFR can also provide a baseline measurement of kidney function that can be used to monitor for side effects of certain anti-hypertensive drugs on kidney function. Additionally, testing of urine samples for protein is used as a secondary indicator of kidney disease. Electrocardiogram (EKG/ECG) testing is done to check for evidence that the heart is under strain from high blood pressure. It may also show whether there is thickening of the heart muscle (left ventricular hypertrophy) or whether the heart has experienced a prior minor disturbance such as a silent heart attack. A chest X-ray or an echocardiogram may also be performed to look for signs of heart enlargement or damage to the heart.

Classification in adults

In people aged 18 years or older, hypertension is defined as either a systolic or a diastolic blood pressure measurement consistently higher than an accepted normal value (this is above 129 or 139 mmHg systolic, 89 mmHg diastolic depending on the guideline). Other thresholds are used (135 mmHg systolic or 85 mmHg diastolic) if measurements are derived from 24-hour ambulatory or home monitoring. International hypertension guidelines have also created categories below the hypertensive range to indicate a continuum of risk with higher blood pressures in the normal range. The Seventh Report of the Joint National Committee on Prevention, Detection, Evaluation and Treatment of High Blood Pressure (JNC7) published in 2003 uses the term prehypertension for blood pressure in the range 120–139 mmHg systolic or 80–89 mmHg diastolic, while European Society of Hypertension Guidelines (2007) and British Hypertension Society (BHS) IV (2004) use optimal, normal and high normal categories to subdivide pressures below 140 mmHg systolic and 90 mmHg diastolic. Hypertension is also sub-classified: JNC7 distinguishes hypertension stage I, hypertension stage II, and isolated systolic hypertension. Isolated systolic hypertension refers to elevated systolic pressure with normal diastolic pressure and is common in the elderly. The ESH-ESC Guidelines (2007) and BHS IV (2004) additionally define a third stage (stage III hypertension) for people with systolic blood pressure exceeding 179 mmHg or a diastolic pressure over 109 mmHg. Hypertension is classified as "resistant" if medications do not reduce blood pressure to normal levels. In November 2017, the American Heart Association and American College of Cardiology published a joint guideline which updates the recommendations of the JNC7 report. The 2020 International Society of Hypertension guidelines define hypertension based on office blood pressure ≥140/90 mmHg or home monitoring blood pressure ≥135/85 mmHg, or 24-hour ambulatory blood pressure average ≥130/80 mmHg (daytime average ≥135/85 mmHg or nighttime average BP ≥120/70 mmHg).

Children
Hypertension occurs in around 0.2 to 3% of newborns; however, blood pressure is not measured routinely in healthy newborns. Hypertension is more common in high risk newborns. A variety of factors, such as gestational age, postconceptional age and birth weight needs to be taken into account when deciding if a blood pressure is normal in a newborn.

Hypertension defined as elevated blood pressure over several visits affects 1% to 5% of children and adolescents and is associated with long-term risks of ill-health. Blood pressure rises with age in childhood and, in children, hypertension is defined as an average systolic or diastolic blood pressure on three or more occasions equal or higher than the 95th percentile appropriate for the sex, age and height of the child. High blood pressure must be confirmed on repeated visits however before characterizing a child as having hypertension. Prehypertension in children has been defined as average systolic or diastolic blood pressure that is greater than or equal to the 90th percentile, but less than the 95th percentile. In adolescents, it has been proposed that hypertension and pre-hypertension are diagnosed and classified using the same criteria as in adults.

Prevention
Much of the disease burden of high blood pressure is experienced by people who are not labeled as hypertensive. Consequently, population strategies are required to reduce the consequences of high blood pressure and reduce the need for antihypertensive medications. Lifestyle changes are recommended to lower blood pressure, before starting medications. The 2004 British Hypertension Society guidelines proposed lifestyle changes consistent with those outlined by the US National High BP Education Program in 2002 for the primary prevention of hypertension:
 maintain normal body weight for adults (e.g. body mass index 20–25 kg/m2)
 reduce dietary sodium intake to <100 mmol/ day (<6 g of sodium chloride or <2.4 g of sodium per day)
 engage in regular aerobic physical activity such as brisk walking (≥30 min per day, most days of the week)
 limit alcohol consumption to no more than 3 units/day in men and no more than 2 units/day in women
 consume a diet rich in fruit and vegetables (e.g. at least five portions per day);
 Stress reduction
Avoiding or learning to manage stress can help a person control blood pressure.

A few relaxation techniques that can help relieve stress are:
 meditation
 warm baths
 yoga
 going on long walks

Effective lifestyle modification may lower blood pressure as much as an individual antihypertensive medication. Combinations of two or more lifestyle modifications can achieve even better results. There is considerable evidence that reducing dietary salt intake lowers blood pressure, but whether this translates into a reduction in mortality and cardiovascular disease remains uncertain. Estimated sodium intake ≥6g/day and <3g/day are both associated with high risk of death or major cardiovascular disease, but the association between high sodium intake and adverse outcomes is only observed in people with hypertension. Consequently, in the absence of results from randomized controlled trials, the wisdom of reducing levels of dietary salt intake below 3g/day has been questioned. ESC guidelines mention periodontitis is associated with poor cardiovascular health status.

The value of routine screening for hypertension is debated. In 2004, the National High Blood Pressure Education Program recommended that children aged 3 years and older have blood pressure measurement at least once at every health care visit and the National Heart, Lung, and Blood Institute and American Academy of Pediatrics made a similar recommendation. However, the American Academy of Family Physicians supports the view of the U.S. Preventive Services Task Force that the available evidence is insufficient to determine the balance of benefits and harms of screening for hypertension in children and adolescents who do not have symptoms. The US Preventive Services Task Force recommends screening adults 18 years or older for hypertension with office blood pressure measurement.

Management

According to one review published in 2003, reduction of the blood pressure by 5 mmHg can decrease the risk of stroke by 34%, of ischemic heart disease by 21%, and reduce the likelihood of dementia, heart failure, and mortality from cardiovascular disease.

Target blood pressure 

Various expert groups have produced guidelines regarding how low the blood pressure target should be when a person is treated for hypertension. These groups recommend a target below the range 140–160 / 90–100 mmHg for the general population. Cochrane reviews recommend similar targets for subgroups such as people with diabetes and people with prior cardiovascular disease. Additionally, Cochrane reviews have found that for older individuals with moderate to high cardiovascular risk, the benefits of trying to achieve a lower than standard blood pressure target (at or below 140/90 mmHg) are outweighed by the risk associated with the intervention. These findings may not be applicable to other populations.

Many expert groups recommend a slightly higher target of 150/90 mmHg for those over somewhere between 60 and 80 years of age. The JNC-8 and American College of Physicians recommend the target of 150/90 mmHg for those over 60 years of age, but some experts within these groups disagree with this recommendation. Some expert groups have also recommended slightly lower targets in those with diabetes or chronic kidney disease with protein loss in the urine, but others recommend the same target as for the general population. The issue of what is the best target and whether targets should differ for high risk individuals is unresolved, although some experts propose more intensive blood pressure lowering than advocated in some guidelines.

For people who have never experienced cardiovascular disease who are at a 10-year risk of cardiovascular disease of less than 10%, the 2017 American Heart Association guidelines recommend medications if the systolic blood pressure is >140 mmHg or if the diastolic BP is >90 mmHg. For people who have experienced cardiovascular disease or those who are at a 10-year risk of cardiovascular disease of greater than 10%, it recommends medications if the systolic blood pressure is >130 mmHg or if the diastolic BP is >80 mmHg.

Lifestyle modifications
The first line of treatment for hypertension is lifestyle changes, including dietary changes, physical exercise, and weight loss. Though these have all been recommended in scientific advisories, a Cochrane systematic review found no evidence (due to lack of data) for effects of weight loss diets on death, long-term complications or adverse events in persons with hypertension. The review did find a decrease in body weight and blood pressure. Their potential effectiveness is similar to and at times exceeds a single medication. If hypertension is high enough to justify immediate use of medications, lifestyle changes are still recommended in conjunction with medication.

Dietary changes shown to reduce blood pressure include diets with low sodium, the DASH diet (Dietary Approaches to Stop Hypertension), which was the best against 11 other diet in an umbrella review, and plant-based diets. There is some evidence green tea consumption may help lower blood pressure, but this is insufficient for it to be recommended as a treatment. There is evidence from randomized, double-blind, placebo-controlled clinical trials that Hibiscus tea consumption significantly reduces systolic blood pressure (-4.71 mmHg, 95% CI [-7.87, -1.55]) and diastolic blood pressure (-4.08 mmHg, 95% CI [-6.48, -1.67]). Beetroot juice consumption also significantly lowers the blood pressure of people with high blood pressure.

Increasing dietary potassium has a potential benefit for lowering the risk of hypertension. The 2015 Dietary Guidelines Advisory Committee (DGAC) stated that potassium is one of the shortfall nutrients which is under-consumed in the United States. However, people who take certain antihypertensive medications (such as ACE-inhibitors or ARBs) should not take potassium supplements or potassium-enriched salts due to the risk of high levels of potassium.

Physical exercise regimens which are shown to reduce blood pressure include isometric resistance exercise, aerobic exercise, resistance exercise, and device-guided breathing.

Stress reduction techniques such as biofeedback or transcendental meditation may be considered as an add-on to other treatments to reduce hypertension, but do not have evidence for preventing cardiovascular disease on their own. Self-monitoring and appointment reminders might support the use of other strategies to improve blood pressure control, but need further evaluation.

Medications
Several classes of medications, collectively referred to as antihypertensive medications, are available for treating hypertension.

First-line medications for hypertension include thiazide-diuretics, calcium channel blockers, angiotensin converting enzyme inhibitors (ACE inhibitors), and angiotensin receptor blockers (ARBs). These medications may be used alone or in combination (ACE inhibitors and ARBs are not recommended for use together); the latter option may serve to minimize counter-regulatory mechanisms that act to restore blood pressure values to pre-treatment levels, although the evidence for first-line combination therapy is not strong enough. Most people require more than one medication to control their hypertension. Medications for blood pressure control should be implemented by a stepped care approach when target levels are not reached. Withdrawal such medications in elderly can be considered by healthcare professional because there is no strong evidence for effect on mortality, myocardial infarction, and stroke.

Previously, beta-blockers such as atenolol were thought to have similar beneficial effects when used as first-line therapy for hypertension. However, a Cochrane review that included 13 trials found that the effects of beta-blockers are inferior to that of other antihypertensive medications in preventing cardiovascular disease.

The prescription of antihypertensive medication for children with hypertension has limited evidence. There is limited evidence which compare it with placebo and shows modest effect to blood pressure in short term. Administration of higher dose did not make the reduction of blood pressure greater.

Resistant hypertension
Resistant hypertension is defined as high blood pressure that remains above a target level, in spite of being prescribed three or more antihypertensive drugs simultaneously with different mechanisms of action. Failing to take prescribed medications as directed is an important cause of resistant hypertension. Resistant hypertension may also result from chronically high activity of the autonomic nervous system, an effect known as neurogenic hypertension. Electrical therapies that stimulate the baroreflex are being studied as an option for lowering blood pressure in people in this situation.

Some common secondary causes of resistant hypertension include obstructive sleep apnea, pheochromocytoma, renal artery stenosis, coarctation of the aorta, and primary aldosteronism.  As many as one in five people with resistant hypertension have primary aldosteronism, which is a treatable and sometimes curable condition.

Refractory hypertension 

Refractory hypertension is characterized by uncontrolled elevated blood pressure unmitigated by five or more antihypertensive agents of different classes, including a long-acting thiazide-like diuretic, a calcium channel blocker, and a blocker of the renin-angiotensin system. People with refractory hypertension typically have increased sympathetic nervous system activity, and are at high risk for more severe cardiovascular diseases and all-cause mortality.

Non-modulating
Non-modulating essential hypertension is a form of salt-sensitive hypertension, where sodium intake does not modulate either adrenal or renal vascular responses to angiotensin II. Individuals with this subset have been termed non-modulators. They make up 25–30% of the hypertensive population.

Epidemiology

Adults
, approximately one billion adults or ~22% of the population of the world have hypertension. It is slightly more frequent in men, in those of low socioeconomic status, and it becomes more common with age. It is common in high, medium, and low income countries. In 2004, rates of high blood pressure were highest in Africa, (30% for both sexes) and lowest in the Americas (18% for both sexes). Rates also vary markedly within regions with rates as low as 3.4% (men) and 6.8% (women) in rural India and as high as 68.9% (men) and 72.5% (women) in Poland. Rates in Africa were about 45% in 2016.

In Europe hypertension occurs in about 30–45% of people . In 1995 it was estimated that 43 million people (24% of the population) in the United States had hypertension or were taking antihypertensive medication. By 2004 this had increased to 29% and further to 32% (76 million US adults) by 2017. In 2017, with the change in definitions for hypertension, 46% of people in the United States are affected. African-American adults in the United States have among the highest rates of hypertension in the world at 44%. It is also more common in Filipino Americans and less common in US whites and Mexican Americans. Differences in hypertension rates are multifactorial and under study.

Children
Rates of high blood pressure in children and adolescents have increased in the last 20 years in the United States. Childhood hypertension, particularly in pre-adolescents, is more often secondary to an underlying disorder than in adults. Kidney disease is the most common secondary cause of hypertension in children and adolescents. Nevertheless, primary or essential hypertension accounts for most cases.

Prognosis

Hypertension is the most important preventable risk factor for premature death worldwide. It increases the risk of ischemic heart disease, strokes, peripheral vascular disease, and other cardiovascular diseases, including heart failure, aortic aneurysms, diffuse atherosclerosis, chronic kidney disease, atrial fibrillation, cancers, leukemia and pulmonary embolism. Hypertension is also a risk factor for cognitive impairment and dementia. Other complications include hypertensive retinopathy and hypertensive nephropathy.

History

Measurement
Modern understanding of the cardiovascular system began with the work of physician William Harvey (1578–1657), who described the circulation of blood in his book "De motu cordis". The English clergyman Stephen Hales made the first published measurement of blood pressure in 1733.  However, hypertension as a clinical entity came into its own with the invention of the cuff-based sphygmomanometer by Scipione Riva-Rocci in 1896. This allowed easy measurement of systolic pressure in the clinic. In 1905, Nikolai Korotkoff improved the technique by describing the Korotkoff sounds that are heard when the artery is ausculted with a stethoscope while the sphygmomanometer cuff is deflated. This permitted systolic and diastolic pressure to be measured.

Identification
The symptoms similar to symptoms of patients with hypertensive crisis are discussed in medieval Persian medical texts in the chapter of "fullness disease". The symptoms include headache, heaviness in the head, sluggish movements, general redness and warm to touch feel of the body, prominent, distended and tense vessels, fullness of the pulse, distension of the skin, coloured and dense urine, loss of appetite, weak eyesight, impairment of thinking, yawning, drowsiness, vascular rupture, and hemorrhagic stroke. Fullness disease was presumed to be due to an excessive amount of blood within the blood vessels.

Descriptions of hypertension as a disease came among others from Thomas Young in 1808 and especially Richard Bright in 1836. The first report of elevated blood pressure in a person without evidence of kidney disease was made by Frederick Akbar Mahomed (1849–1884).

Treatment
Historically the treatment for what was called the "hard pulse disease" consisted in reducing the quantity of blood by bloodletting or the application of leeches. This was advocated by The Yellow Emperor of China, Cornelius Celsus, Galen, and Hippocrates. The therapeutic approach for the treatment of hard pulse disease included changes in lifestyle (staying away from anger and sexual intercourse) and dietary program for patients (avoiding the consumption of wine, meat, and pastries, reducing the volume of food in a meal, maintaining a low-energy diet and the dietary usage of spinach and vinegar).

In the 19th and 20th centuries, before effective pharmacological treatment for hypertension became possible, three treatment modalities were used, all with numerous side-effects: strict sodium restriction (for example the rice diet), sympathectomy (surgical ablation of parts of the sympathetic nervous system), and pyrogen therapy (injection of substances that caused a fever, indirectly reducing blood pressure).

The first chemical for hypertension, sodium thiocyanate, was used in 1900 but had many side effects and was unpopular. Several other agents were developed after the Second World War, the most popular and reasonably effective of which were tetramethylammonium chloride, hexamethonium, hydralazine, and reserpine (derived from the medicinal plant Rauvolfia serpentina). None of these were well tolerated. A major breakthrough was achieved with the discovery of the first well-tolerated orally available agents. The first was chlorothiazide, the first thiazide diuretic and developed from the antibiotic sulfanilamide, which became available in 1958. Subsequently, beta blockers, calcium channel blockers, angiotensin converting enzyme (ACE) inhibitors, angiotensin receptor blockers, and renin inhibitors were developed as antihypertensive agents.

Society and culture

Awareness

The World Health Organization has identified hypertension, or high blood pressure, as the leading cause of cardiovascular mortality. The World Hypertension League (WHL), an umbrella organization of 85 national hypertension societies and leagues, recognized that more than 50% of the hypertensive population worldwide are unaware of their condition. To address this problem, the WHL initiated a global awareness campaign on hypertension in 2005 and dedicated May 17 of each year as World Hypertension Day (WHD). Over the past three years, more national societies have been engaging in WHD and have been innovative in their activities to get the message to the public. In 2007, there was record participation from 47 member countries of the WHL. During the week of WHD, all these countries – in partnership with their local governments, professional societies, nongovernmental organizations and private industries – promoted hypertension awareness among the public through several media and public rallies. Using mass media such as Internet and television, the message reached more than 250 million people. As the momentum picks up year after year, the WHL is confident that almost all the estimated 1.5 billion people affected by elevated blood pressure can be reached.

Economics
High blood pressure is the most common chronic medical problem prompting visits to primary health care providers in USA. The American Heart Association estimated the direct and indirect costs of high blood pressure in 2010 as $76.6 billion. In the US 80% of people with hypertension are aware of their condition, 71% take some antihypertensive medication, but only 48% of people aware that they have hypertension adequately control it. Adequate management of hypertension can be hampered by inadequacies in the diagnosis, treatment, or control of high blood pressure. Health care providers face many obstacles to achieving blood pressure control, including resistance to taking multiple medications to reach blood pressure goals. People also face the challenges of adhering to medicine schedules and making lifestyle changes. Nonetheless, the achievement of blood pressure goals is possible, and most importantly, lowering blood pressure significantly reduces the risk of death due to heart disease and stroke, the development of other debilitating conditions, and the cost associated with advanced medical care.

Other animals
Hypertension in cats is indicated with a systolic blood pressure greater than 150 mmHg, with amlodipine the usual first-line treatment. A cat with a systolic blood pressure above 170 mmHg is considered hypertensive. If a cat has other problems such as any kidney disease or retina detachment then a blood pressure below 160 mm HG may also need to be monitored.

Normal blood pressure in dogs can differ substantially between breeds but hypertension is often diagnosed if systolic blood pressure is above 160 mmHg particularly if this is associated with target organ damage. Inhibitors of the renin-angiotensin system and calcium channel blockers are often used to treat hypertension in dogs, although other drugs may be indicated for specific conditions causing high blood pressure.

References

Further reading

External links 

 
Blood pressure
Medical conditions related to obesity
Aging-associated diseases
Wikipedia medicine articles ready to translate (full)
Wikipedia neurology articles ready to translate
Articles containing video clips